The Life FM is a network of Christian radio stations in the United States, broadcasting southern gospel music.

History
In 2015, 103.1 WHQA in Honea Path, South Carolina became the flagship station of The Life FM, after the station, then WRIX-FM, was donated to The Power Foundation.

Stations
The Life FM is currently heard on 22 full-powered stations, 6 translators, and 2 HD signals with stations in Alabama, Arkansas, Georgia, Illinois, Indiana, Mississippi, North Carolina, South Carolina and Tennessee.

Owned and operated stations

Translators

HD Radio affiliates

References

External links

The Life FM's webcast

Christian radio stations in the United States
American radio networks
Southern Gospel radio stations in the United States